Thomas Pettersson may refer to:
Tommy Pettersson - Swedish motorcycle speedway racer, born 1952
Thomas Petersson (comedian) - Swedish comedian, born 1962
Thomas Pettersson (journalist) - Swedish journalist, born 1957